Harold Riley may refer to:
Harold William Hounsfield Riley (1877–1946), member of the Legislative Assembly of Alberta
Harold Riley (artist) (born 1934), English artist
Harold Riley (footballer) (1909–1982), English footballer
Harold Riley (cricketer) (1902–1989), English cricketer

See also
Harry Riley (disambiguation)